Serenata is the Italian word for serenade.

Serenata may refer to:

Music

Albums
Serenata (Alfie Boe album), 2014
Serenata, 1984 album by Maastrichts Salon Orkest & André Rieu
Serenata, 1997 album by Beppe Gambetta
The Serenata, 1959 album by John Young
Serenata, 2003 album by Manny Manuel
Serenata, 2009 album by Armik

Classical compositions
Serenata Notturna (1776), by Wolfgang Amadeus Mozart
Serenata in vano (1914), quintet for clarinet, bassoon, horn, cello and double-bass by Carl Nielsen
Concierto serenata (1952), for harp and orchestra by Joaquín Rodrigo
Serenata for Orchestra (Piston) (1956), by Walter Piston

Ensembles
Serenata (choir), Philippine children's choir in Jeddah
Serenata Guayanesa, vocal and instrumental quartet that plays typical Venezuelan folk music

Songs
"Serenata", 1947 composition by Leroy Anderson also adapted with lyrics by Mitchell Parish, recorded by Nat King Cole in 1962 on his album Nat King Cole Sings/George Shearing Plays as well as Sarah Vaughan in 1960
"Serenata", 1984 single by Toto Cutugno

Other
Eupithecia serenata, a moth in the family Geometridae found in Russia
 Serenata, a Bang & Olufsen and Samsung mobile telephone

See also
Serenade (disambiguation)